Vallerey is a French surname that may refer to
Georges Vallerey (1902–1956), French Olympic swimmer
Georges Vallerey, Jr. (1927–1954), French Olympic swimmer, son of the above
Gisèle Vallerey (1930–2010), French Olympic swimmer, daughter of Georges
Tancrède Vallerey (1892–?), French writer